Melissa Raymond  (born ) is a Canadian retired female volleyball player, who played as a middle blocker.

She was part of the Canada women's national volleyball team at the 2002 FIVB Volleyball Women's World Championship in Germany. On club level, she played with Université de Sherbrooke.

Clubs
 Université de Sherbrooke (2002)

References

External links
www.usherbrooke.ca
The Globe and Mail
pedagogie

1980 births
Living people
Canadian women's volleyball players
Place of birth missing (living people)
Middle blockers
Université de Sherbrooke alumni